José Rafael Llenas-Aybar (circa 1984 – 3 May 1996) was a boy from the Dominican Republic who went missing and later found dead in May 1996. Llenas Aybar was born into an upper-middle-class white family, his parents were José Rafael Llenas Menicucci and Ileana del Carmen Aybar Nadal. His father is first cousin of MLB player Winston Llenas and second cousin-once removed of politician Hipólito Mejía, and his mother is second cousin of Jacinto Peynado Garrigosa, the then-vice president of the country.

Llenas Aybar’s murder was a high-profile case that gained notoriety due to the tragic nature of the murder but also because the victim was from an upper-middle-class family with very close ties to media moguls, one of the individuals accused of taking part in the crime, Mario José Redondo Llenas (“Redondo Llenas”), was a cousin of the victim, and the family of the Argentine ambassador allegedly had ties to the incident.

Murder and investigation

Discovery of body
On May 4, 1996, José Rafael Llenas Aybar, the child of a middle/upper-class family of Santo Domingo, Dominican Republic was found murdered, lying in a creek bed some 24 km to the northwest of the city. His body was bound in duct tape and had received thirty-four stab wounds.

The victim's mother has stated that her son called her at work to ask for permission to go out with his cousin, Redondo Llenas, who lived across the street and had invited him to a motorcycle exhibition at a local supermarket, but asked the boy to be back by five in the afternoon. An hour later, Redondo Llenas called his aunt and told her that his cousin had requested to be dropped off at Sebelen Bowling Center "La Bolera" because he was meeting some friends. Mrs. Llenas has said that she found this strange, because her son didn't go out without adult supervision, so she went to the bowling center looking for him and found nothing. She then looked for him in the supermarket and found no motorcycle exhibit. She immediately called her cousin Guillermo Moncada Aybar for help in finding her son.

Factors hindering investigators
Several factors surrounding the investigation and trial hindered the discovery of the exact motives behind the crime, the number and identity of the people involved, as well as what exactly occurred that day:

 The scene where the body was found was controlled by the authorities only after dozens of people had gone through it – some were officials but many others were individuals whose identities were never confirmed and whose motives could have ranged from simple curiosity to intentional contamination of the scene.
 The scientific value of the autopsy was compromised by the fact that it was practiced after the body had been submitted to funerary processes, causing the permanent loss of valuable evidence, including but not limited to, details regarding used weapons and number of attackers.
 The alleged murder weapon(s) was (were) never recovered.
 The clothes of the victim and of the accused went missing while in police custody, barring the opportunity for any type of forensic examination.
 Redondo Llenas alleged that police officers falsely denied the existence of audio transcripts from his interrogation while in police custody.  The police argued that the recordings never existed but during the trial there was evidence, including testimony from the victim’s mother, that officers recorded at least parts of the interrogation. The content of the audio transcripts and the reason for their disappearance remain a mystery.
 Redondo Llenas alleged that Teresa Meccia’s husband, the then Argentine ambassador to the Dominican Republic, Luis Palmas de la Calzada, and son, Martin Palmas Meccia, were involved. Palmas Meccia graduated high school with Redondo Llenas and the other accused, Juan Moliné Rodriguez. Specifically, Redondo Llenas asserted that Palmas de la Calzada forced them to murder the boy under the threat that if they did not he would murder Redondo Llenas’ younger sister. Additionally, Redondo Llenas asserted that in a period of approximately four months he was submitted to a series of traumatic experiences by the Palmas family that included witnessing drug deals by the Palmas, at least one other murder and had been the victim of a sexual attack which was videotaped by Luis Palmas de la Calzada. The Argentinian family vehemently denied all allegations but several factors cast doubt over their denial:
 The site where the body was found was close to one of the Palmas’ properties, a dog breeding facility. 
 The Palmas’ attitude following the accusations was out of the ordinary for a diplomatic family – they resisted cooperating minimally with the authorities, utilized their diplomatic immunity protection to oppose any interrogation and investigation of their home or any of their properties and immediately exited the country.  
 They jeopardized their reputation, future career opportunities and left behind many of their assets, solely due to the accusations of Redondo Llenas, an 18-year-old murder suspect.
 The vehicle allegedly used for the crime was seized by police officers but was never examined forensically. It was repaired and was assigned to active police service only three days after the crime had taken place, in obvious violation of the law and due process.
 While the case was in "", a phase in the Dominican criminal process where an appointed magistrate conducts a separate investigation while appraising the merits of the case proposed by the police, a set of bizarre events took place: 
 The magistrate, Alexis Henriquez, requested supplementary security and the local police assigned him a bodyguard that had been working for Palmas Meccia. According to Redondo Llenas this man was present on the day that Palmas Meccia, acting on behalf of his father, Palmas de la Calzada, gave the instructions to deliver the boy.   
 Key evidence allegedly disappeared from the office of the magistrate including video footage obtained by the investigative magistrate that was supposed to have proved the linkage of the Palmas’ to this case and other criminal activities. 
 There were continuous leakages to the press regarding the direction of the investigation that jeopardized the authorities’ ability to have the upper hand and allowed potential suspects to cover their tracks.
 The police investigations concluded the crime was as a kidnapping with the intention of asking for a ransom of approximately US$700,000, but there was no evidence found or presented to prove the accused ever asked for money.
 There was speculation about possible sexual motives but there was no evidence found or presented to prove abuse.

Perpetrators
According to the interrogation and trial transcripts, Redondo Llenas (18 years old at the time), under duress by Palmas de la Calzada, and Moliné Rodriguez (also 18 years old at the time) invited José Rafael Llenas Aybar out. It is unknown what exactly happened between the time the boy left his home and the time he was found dead.

The fact that the boy and the mother felt safe with Redondo Llenas suggest that up to that point in their lives Redondo Llenas was a trusted member of the family. What happened to Redondo Llenas that transformed him from trusted cousin to accomplice in murder is possibly the greatest mystery of this tragic crime. He has argued exceptional duress from the Palmas’ while psychiatric tests on both Redondo Llenas and Moliné Rodriguez suggest personality disorders. The scientific value of these tests has been questioned by experts because of the manner in which the tests were performed, conclusions drawn and presented.

Trial and sentencing
The trial concluded in January 1997 with guilty verdicts for Redondo Llenas and Moliné Rodriguez; both were sentenced to the maximum penalty of 30 years' imprisonment and charged US$300,000 each in damages to the victim’s family. An appeal in 1999 slightly reduced Moline Rodriguez’s term to 20 years, on account that he was an accomplice.

Palmas de la Calzada and his family were never prosecuted, first due to their diplomatic status which was the result of a direct designation by former Argentine president Carlos Menem, and second, because they quickly left the country, even before the Argentine government terminated their tenure. Although repeatedly summoned by the Dominican authorities they never returned.

The possibility of a satanic implication to the case was discussed and caused a lot of concern among the very religious; Dominican Republic at the time was 90% Roman Catholic. A member of the Llenas family appeared in a widely seen TV show in the Dominican Republic, Revista 110 produced by Julio Hazim, to discuss potential evidence of a satanic cult and the Palmas’ relationship to Macumba and black magic practitioners such as  José López Rega, who is known as “El Brujo”.
The trial of Redondo Llenas and Moliné Rodriguez was one of the first broadly televised in Dominican history. The broadcast highly out-rated all other programming during its course.

Aftermath
Further investigation by Dominican journalist and filmmaker Erwin Cott uncovered that Palmas de la Calzada was a member of ultra-rightist Argentine Anticommunist Alliance during the Dirty War, an organization said to be responsible for countless deaths and disappearances during the 1970s in Argentina.

In 2007, Juan Moliné Rodríguez asked to be released on parole, which was widely criticized and ultimately rejected. He tried again in 2009 but was rejected again.

On November 5, 2013, Mario Redondo Llenas asked to be released on parole due to his "good behavior", he apologized to his aunt and uncle for killing his 12-year-old cousin in 1996. Redondo Llenas listed his involvement in prison literacy programs and his college degree as examples of his rehabilitation.

References

Murder in the Dominican Republic
1996 crimes in the Dominican Republic
1996 murders in North America
1990s murders in the Dominican Republic